Growing Up is the debut album by Japanese punk rock band Hi-Standard. It was released on an American label, Fat Wreck Chords, in February 1996. According to Fat Mike in a 2015 interview with CBC, it sold 700,000 copies during the heyday of Fat Wreck Chords in the late nineties.

Track listing
All songs written by Hi-Standard, unless otherwise stated.
"Summer of Love" – 1:47    
"Wait for the Sun" – 2:18    
"Who'll Be the Next" – 2:46    
"Lonely" – 2:24    
"Saturday Night" (Coulter, Martin) – 2:06    
"I'm Walkin'" – 2:07     
"Maximum Overdrive" – 2:43     
"Growing Up" – 2:00     
"Tell Me Something, Happy News" – 2:02     
"New Life" – 1:46     
"Since You Been Gone" (Ballard) – 2:06     
"Kiss Me Again" – 2:24     
"Sunny Day" – 3:06     
"In the Brightly Moonlight" – 3:12

Personnel
 Akihiro Nanba – vocals, bass
 Ken Yokoyama – guitar, vocals
 Akira Tsuneoka – drums
 Morty Okin – trumpet
 Lars Nylander – horn, trombone
 Gerry Lundquist – trombone
 Skankin' Pickle – trumpet
 Recorded between August 2–15, 1995
 Produced by Fat Mike, Ryan Greene, and Hi-Standard
 Engineered by Ryan Greene

Certifications and sales

References

External links
Fat Wreck Chords album page

1996 albums
Hi-Standard albums
Fat Wreck Chords albums
Albums produced by Ryan Greene